Horsley is a small village and civil parish in Northumberland, England.

Nearby villages include Heddon-on-the-Wall, Ovingham, Ovington and Wylam.

Demography
The data below show that 49.4% of the population in Horsley (Parish) are male and 50.6% are female, which is in line with that of the national average, as well as that of the county of Northumberland.

A total of 1.5% of the population were from a black, Asian and minority ethnic (BAME) group in Horsley (Parish). This figure is somewhat lower than that of the average in Northumberland , as well as being significantly lower than the national average .

Data from the Office for National Statistics found that the average life expectancy in the Bywell electoral ward is 81.4 years for men, and 83.0 years for women. These statistics compare very favourably, when compared to the average life expectancy in the North East of England, of 77.4 and 81.4 years, for men and women respectively.

Car ownership is very high in Horsley (Parish), with a total of 92.9% households having access to at least one car. This is significantly higher than the average within Northumberland , as well as the national average .

Governance
Bywell is a local council ward in the county of Northumberland.

, the Bywell ward is served by Conservative Party councillor, Karen Rachel Quinn.

The village is located within the parliamentary constituency of Hexham, and is served by Conservative Party Member of Parliament (MP), Guy Opperman.

Landmarks
Nearby is Rudchester Hall, a medieval pele tower, much altered and extended in Gothic style in the eighteenth and nineteenth centuries.

Around  to the north-west of the village are the remains of a medieval manor house and tower house at Welton Hall, now located within a farm complex. The tower house dates from the late fourteenth or early fifteenth-century and is roofless. The manor house is even older, but has been much altered and rebuilt.

Transport

Air 

Bus 
The village is served by two buses per hour to Hexham and Newcastle, with one bus per hour to Carlisle.

Rail 
From Wylam, there is an hourly service to both Hexham and Newcastle. There is a more regular service at Prudhoe, with three trains per hour to Hexham and Newcastle, as well as a twice-hourly service to Carlisle.

Road 
The former route of the A69, now the B6528, used to run through the village to Heddon-on-the-Wall, but is now bypassed.

See also
 Heddon-on-the-Wall
 Ovingham
 Ovington
 Wylam

References

External links

Villages in Northumberland
Civil parishes in Northumberland